Nanguneri is an assembly constituency located in Tirunelveli district in Tamil Nadu. It falls under Tirunelveli Lok Sabha Constituency. It is one of the 234 State Legislative Assembly Constituencies in Tamil Nadu, in India.

Nadar is the biggest community in the Nanguneri assembly constituency who make up 40% population. The population of other communities is Devendra Kula Vellalar 13%, Maravar 10%, Muslims 9%, Konar 8%, Pillaimar 8%, Paraiyar 5%. The other communities make up rest of the 7% population.

Madras State assembly

Tamil Nadu assembly

Election results

2021

2019 By-election

2016

2011

2006

2001

1996

1991

1989

1984

1980

1977

1971

1967

1962

1957

1952

References 

 

Assembly constituencies of Tamil Nadu
Tirunelveli district